Pullo District is one of eight districts of the province Parinacochas in Peru.

Geography 
Other mountains are listed below:

Ethnic groups 
The people in the district are mainly indigenous citizens of Quechua descent. Quechua is the language which the majority of the population (54.56%) learnt to speak in childhood, 44.42% of the residents started speaking using the Spanish language (2007 Peru Census).

See also
 Inka Wasi

References